Wilmington Township may refer to:

Wilmington Township, Union County, Arkansas, in Union County, Arkansas
Wilmington Township, Will County, Illinois
Wilmington Township, DeKalb County, Indiana
Wilmington Township, Wabaunsee County, Kansas, in Wabaunsee County, Kansas
Wilmington Township, Houston County, Minnesota
Wilmington Township, New Hanover County, North Carolina
Wilmington Township, Lawrence County, Pennsylvania
Wilmington Township, Mercer County, Pennsylvania

See also
Wilmington (disambiguation)

Township name disambiguation pages